SMS Rail Lines  is a shortline railroad based at Pureland Industrial Park in Bridgeport, New Jersey. The company handles all freight car delivery to businesses located within the industrial park. It also operates lines in  Morrisville, Pennsylvania, and Guilderland, New York. Guilderland-based operations operate as SMS Rail Lines of New York, LLC . SMS maintains many locomotives built by the Baldwin Locomotive Works. SMS provides chemical off-loading equipment and transload facilities to enable businesses to receive rail freight traffic.

Operations
In the Delaware Valley, SMS Rail Lines operates both industrial park switching operations and a county controlled rail line.
Morrisville – Serves the Penn Warner Industrial Park in Morrisville, Pennsylvania, with access to the Conrail Shared Assets Operations Morrisville Yard
Pureland – Serves the Pureland Industrial Complex in Logan Township, New Jersey, interchanging with Conrail Shared Assets Operations Penns Grove Secondary
Westville – Serves the Sunoco Logistics Eagle Point terminal in Westville, New Jersey, interchanging with Conrail Shared Assets Operations.
Salem - Serves the Salem County Short Line between Salem, New Jersey, Woodstown, New Jersey, and Swedesboro, New Jersey interchanging with Southern Railroad of New Jersey.

In Guilderland, New York, SMS Rail Lines of New York, LLC serves the Northeastern Industrial Park, interchanging with CSX Transportation at Guilderland Center, NY and Norfolk Southern at Delanson, NY.

History
SMS Rail Lines began operating in the Philadelphia area in June 1994. In November 2006, the railroad began operations in Albany, New York. The company plans to begin passenger excursions out of Pilesgrove Township, New Jersey by the end of 2022.

Motive power

SMS runs a variety of locomotives, most being built by the Baldwin Locomotive works. SMS also owns units built by GM's Electro-Motive Diesel and GE Transportation.

ALCO
0-6-0 steam (1), undergoing restoration.
Baldwin: 
VO-660 diesel (2)
VO-1000 diesel (1)
DS-4-4-660 diesel (1)
DS-4-4-750 diesel (1)
DS-4-4-1000 diesel (2)
S-12 diesel (14)
AS-616 diesel (3)
EMD: 
SW14 diesel (1)
SW1200RS diesel (1)
GP38-3 diesel (1)
GE: 
B23-7 diesel (4)

References

New Jersey railroads
New York (state) railroads
Pennsylvania railroads
Railway companies established in 1994
1994 establishments in Pennsylvania
1994 establishments in New Jersey
2006 establishments in New York (state)
American companies established in 1994